L. Francis Griffin (September 15, 1917 - January 18, 1980) was a civil rights advocate in the United States.

He was born in Norfolk, Virginia. He became involved in fighting against segregated and inferior schools for African American children. He was a leader of Virginia's NAACP.

Griffin had two daughters who were denied access to Prince Edward County, Virginia's segregated public schools for whites and Griffin sued on their behalf in a case that became part of Brown vs. Board of Education. The daughters lived with white families in California and attended schools there after the county closed its schools rather than integrate. Griffin Boulevard in Farmville is named for him.

References

1917 births
1980 deaths